Diego Gutiérrez Chinea (born 3 September 2000) is a Spanish footballer who plays for UD Las Palmas Atlético as a central midfielder.

Club career
Gutiérrez was born in Adeje, Santa Cruz de Tenerife, Canary Islands, and made his senior debut with Tercera División side CD Marino during the 2017–18 campaign. On 25 July 2018, he joined Albacete Balompié and returned to the youth setup.

On 30 August 2019, Martínez returned to Marino, and immediately became a regular starter for the club. On 5 October 2020, he signed for UD Las Palmas, being initially assigned to the C-team also in the fourth division.

Martínez made his first team debut for Las Palmas on 17 December 2020, coming on as a second-half substitute for Kirian Rodríguez in a 4–0 away win against CD Varea, for the season's Copa del Rey. His Segunda División debut occurred the following 20 May, as he replaced fellow youth graduate Fabio González in a 0–1 away loss against Sporting Gijón.

References

External links

2000 births
Living people
People from Tenerife
Sportspeople from the Province of Santa Cruz de Tenerife
Spanish footballers
Footballers from the Canary Islands
Association football midfielders
Segunda División players
Segunda División B players
Segunda Federación players
Tercera División players
UD Las Palmas C players
UD Las Palmas Atlético players
UD Las Palmas players